Kattayattu Devi Kshethram is a Devi temple situated in Peruvayal, a village near Kozhikkode, India.

Main deity
The deity worshipped in this temple is the goddess Devi in her two forms as Moovanthikkali and Arayil Bhagavathi.

Other deities (Upadevathas)
Other deities worshipped in the temple are Lord Ganapathi and Lord Ayyappa.

Important days of the temple 
Paattulsavam
Prathishta dina varshikam
Pusthakapooja
Thottam

References

Bhagavathi temples in Kerala
Hindu temples in Kozhikode district